In the process of photosynthesis, the phosphorylation of ADP to form ATP using the energy of sunlight is called photophosphorylation. Cyclic photophosphorylation occurs in both aerobic and anaerobic conditions, driven by the main primary source of energy available to living organisms, which is sunlight. All organisms produce a phosphate compound, ATP, which is the universal energy currency of life. In photophosphorylation, light energy is used to pump protons across a biological membrane, mediated by flow of electrons through an electron transport chain. This stores energy in a proton gradient. As the protons flow back through an enzyme called ATP synthase, ATP is generated from ADP and inorganic phosphate. ATP is essential in the Calvin cycle to assist in the synthesis of carbohydrates from carbon dioxide and NADPH.

ATP and reactions
Both the structure of ATP synthase and its underlying gene are remarkably similar in all known forms of life. ATP synthase is powered by a transmembrane electrochemical potential gradient, usually in the form of a proton gradient. In all living organisms, a series of redox reactions is used to produce a transmembrane electrochemical potential gradient, or a so-called proton motive force (pmf). 

Redox reactions are chemical reactions in which electrons are transferred from a donor molecule to an acceptor molecule. The underlying force driving these reactions is the Gibbs free energy of the reactants relative to the products. If donor and acceptor (the reactants) are of higher free energy energy than the reaction products, the electron transfer may occur spontaneously. The Gibbs free energy is the energy available ("free") to do work.  Any reaction that decreases the overall Gibbs free energy of a system will proceed spontaneously (given that the system is isobaric and also at constant temperature), although the reaction may proceed slowly if it is kinetically inhibited.

The fact that a reaction is thermodynamically possible does not mean that it will actually occur.  A mixture of hydrogen gas and oxygen gas does not spontaneously ignite. It is necessary either to supply an activation energy or to lower the intrinsic activation energy of the system, in order to make most biochemical reactions proceed at a useful rate.  Living systems use complex macromolecular structures to lower the activation energies of biochemical reactions.
 
It is possible to couple a thermodynamically favorable reaction (a transition from a high-energy state to a lower-energy state) to a thermodynamically unfavorable reaction (such as a separation of charges, or the creation of an osmotic gradient), in such a way that the overall free energy of the system decreases (making it thermodynamically possible), while useful work is done at the same time. The principle that biological macromolecules catalyze a thermodynamically unfavorable reaction if and only if a thermodynamically favorable reaction occurs simultaneously, underlies all known forms of life.

The transfer of electrons from a donor molecule to an acceptor molecule can be spatially separated into a series of intermediate redox reactions. This is an electron transport chain (ETC). Electron transport chains often produce energy in the form of a transmembrane electrochemical potential gradient. The gradient can be used to transport molecules across membranes. Its energy can be used to produce ATP or to do useful work, for instance mechanical work of a rotating bacterial flagella.

Cyclic photophosphorylation
This form of photophosphorylation occurs on the stroma lamella, or fret channels. In cyclic photophosphorylation, the high-energy electron released from P700, a pigment in a complex called photosystem I, flows in a cyclic pathway. The electron starts in photosystem I, passes from the primary election acceptor to ferredoxin and then to plastoquinone, next to cytochrome bf (a similar complex to that found in mitochondria), and finally to plastocyanin before returning to photosystem I. This transport chain produces a proton-motive force, pumping H ions across the membrane and producing a concentration gradient that can be used to power ATP synthase during chemiosmosis. This pathway is known as cyclic photophosphorylation, and it produces neither O nor NADPH. Unlike non-cyclic photophosphorylation, NADP does not accept the electrons; they are instead sent back to the cytochrome bf complex.

In bacterial photosynthesis, a single photosystem is used, and therefore is involved in cyclic photophosphorylation.
It is favored in anaerobic conditions and conditions of high irradiance and CO compensation points.

Non-cyclic photophosphorylation
The other pathway, non-cyclic photophosphorylation, is a two-stage process involving two different chlorophyll photosystems in the thylakoid membrane. First, a photon is absorbed by chlorophyll pigments surrounding the reaction core center of photosystem II. The light excites an electron in the pigment P680 at the core of photosystem II, which is transferred to the primary electron acceptor, pheophytin, leaving behind P680. The energy of P680 is used in two steps to split a water molecule into 2H + 1/2 O + 2e (photolysis or light-splitting). An electron from the water molecule reduces P680 back to P680, while the H and oxygen are released. The electron transfers from pheophytin to plastoquinone (PQ), which takes 2e (in two steps) from pheophytin, and two H Ions from the stroma to form PQH. This plastoquinol is later oxidized back to PQ, releasing the 2e to the cytochrome bf complex and the two H ions into the thylakoid lumen. The electrons then pass through Cyt b and Cyt f to plastocyanin, using energy from photosystem I to pump hydrogen ions (H) into the thylakoid space. This creates a H gradient, making H ions flow back into the stroma of the chloroplast, providing the energy for the (re)generation of ATP.

The photosystem II complex replaced its lost electrons from HO, so electrons are not returned to photosystem II as they would in the analogous cyclic pathway. Instead, they are transferred to the photosystem I complex, which boosts their energy to a higher level using a second solar photon. The excited electrons are transferred to a series of acceptor molecules, but this time are passed on to an enzyme called ferredoxin-NADP reductase, which uses them to catalyze the reaction

NADP + 2H + 2e → NADPH + H

This consumes the H ions produced by the splitting of water, leading to a net production of 1/2O, ATP, and NADPH + H with the consumption of solar photons and water.

The concentration of NADPH in the chloroplast may help regulate which pathway electrons take through the light reactions. When the chloroplast runs low on ATP for the Calvin cycle, NADPH will accumulate and the plant may shift from noncyclic to cyclic electron flow.

Early history of research
In 1950, first experimental evidence for the existence of photophosphorylation in vivo was presented by Otto Kandler using intact Chlorella cells and interpreting his findings as light-dependent ATP formation. 
In 1954, Daniel I. Arnon et.al. discovered photophosphorylation in vitro in isolated chloroplasts with the help of P32. 
His first review on the early research of photophosphorylation was published in 1956.

References

Professor Luis Gordillo
Fenchel T, King GM, Blackburn TH.  Bacterial Biogeochemistry: The Ecophysiology of Mineral Cycling.  2nd ed.  Elsevier; 1998.
Lengeler JW, Drews G, Schlegel HG, editors.  Biology of the Prokaryotes.  Blackwell Sci; 1999.
Nelson DL, Cox MM.  Lehninger Principles of Biochemistry.  4th ed.  Freeman; 2005.

Stumm W, Morgan JJ.  Aquatic Chemistry.  3rd ed.  Wiley; 1996.
Thauer RK, Jungermann K, Decker K.  Energy Conservation in Chemotrophic Anaerobic Bacteria.  Bacteriol. Rev. 41:100–180; 1977.
White D.  The Physiology and Biochemistry of Prokaryotes.  2nd ed.  Oxford University Press; 2000.
Voet D, Voet JG.  Biochemistry.  3rd ed.  Wiley; 2004.
Cj C. Enverg
Photosynthesis
Light reactions